Clinton Park is a  public park in Portland, Oregon's South Tabor neighborhood, in the United States. The space was acquired in 1948.

References

External links
 

Parks in Portland, Oregon
1948 establishments in Oregon
South Tabor, Portland, Oregon